A horse collar is a part of a horse harness that is used to distribute the load around a horse's neck and shoulders when pulling a wagon or plough. The collar often supports and pads a pair of curved metal or wooden pieces, called hames, to which the traces of the harness are attached. The collar allows the horse to use its full strength when pulling, essentially enabling the animal to push forward with its hindquarters into the collar. If wearing a yoke or a breastcollar, the horse had to pull with its less-powerful shoulders. The collar had another advantage over the yoke as it reduced pressure on the horse's windpipe.

From the time of the invention of the horse collar, horses became more valuable for plowing and pulling. When the horse was harnessed in the collar, the horse could apply 50% more power to a task in a given time period than could an ox, due to the horse's greater speed. Additionally, horses generally have greater endurance than oxen, and thus can work more hours each day. The importance and value of horses as a resource for improving agricultural production increased accordingly.

The horse collar was very important to the development of many areas of the world. Wherever oxen were used and could be replaced with horses, the use of horses boosted economies, and reduced reliance on subsistence farming. This allowed people more free time to take on specialized activities, and consequently to the development of early industry, education, and the arts in the rise of market-based towns.

Design 
A horse collar is oval rather than circular and it is by design not very flexible. It is a padded appliance that conforms well to the shape of the horse's body. It is constructed so that at all points of contact with the body of the horse it avoids the air passage. By protecting the airway of the horse it became possible for the animal to use its full force to pull a  load.

History

Predecessors to the horse collar

Earliest predecessors 
Long before the horse collar harness, there was the less efficient throat-girth harness. This, it was claimed, could be found in many ancient civilizations, according to early 20th century French cavalry officer Lefebvre des Noëttes. This type of collar was supposedly used in ancient Chaldea, both Sumeria and Assyria (1400–800 BC), ancient Egypt during the New Kingdom (1570–1070 BC), Shang dynasty China (1600–1050 BC), Minoan Crete (2700–1450 BC), Classical Greece (550–323 BC), and ancient Rome (510 BC–476 AD). With this "ancient harness", ploughs and carts were pulled using harnesses that had flat straps across the neck and chest of the animal, with the load attached at the top of the collar, above the neck, in a manner similar to a yoke. These straps pressed against the horse's sterno-cephalicus muscle and trachea which restricted its breathing and reducing the pulling power of the horse. Thus, the harder a horse pulled, the more strongly it choked off its own breathing.   Because of these supposed physical constraints, oxen were used in preference to horses for heavy work, as they do not have this problem due to anatomical differences and could be yoked to their loads.

In 1972, Spruytte published Ancient Harness Systems which argued that there were at least three ancient traction systems shown in art, none of which choked the horses. The shoulder traction (ancient Egyptian) and breast traction (Greek and Roman) artwork had been mis-seen and mis-drawn as a composite that matched neither. This he sought to demonstrate by building reproduction chariots and harness, and running them with suitable teams. These had to be borrowed ponies as horses were too large for the surviving Egyptian chariot he used as a model.

Breastcollar harness

The throat-girth design was not improved until the Chinese breast-strap or "breastcollar" harness developed during the Warring States (481–221 BC) era in China. The Chinese breast harness became known throughout Central Asia by the 7th century, and was introduced to Europe by the 8th century.

Its first depiction in artwork was on lacquer-ware boxes from the ancient State of Chu. This type of harness put pressure upon the sternum, where the line of traction is directly linked with the skeletal system of the horse, allowing for nearly full exertion. It was in universal use by the time of the Chinese Han dynasty (202 BC – 220 AD), depicted in artwork of hundreds of different carvings, stone reliefs, and stamped bricks showing it featured on horses pulling chariots. This type of breast-strap harness became known in Central Asia and elsewhere with the Avars, Magyars, Bohemians, Poles, and Russians during the 7th to 10th centuries. After Central Asia, the first breast-strap harness was spread to Europe by the 8th century (in depicted artwork), and became more widespread by the following 9th century (for example, depicted in a tapestry of the Oseberg ship burial).

The problem with a breastcollar harness was that the actual shafts of the cart, chariot, or other vehicle are attached to a surcingle around the barrel of the horse. The breastplate primarily kept the surcingle from slipping back, not as the primary pushing object. This results in the horse literally pulling the load, a less efficient use of the animal. The modern breastcollar has traces which transfer the pull directly from the breastcollar, but a horse collar still is more effective for pulling heavy loads.

China 

After the breastcollar harness, the next and final evolutionary stage was the collar harness. The collar allows a horse to use its full strength when pulling, essentially allowing the horse to push forward with its hindquarters into the collar.  The fully developed collar harness was developed in Southern and Northern dynasties China during the 5th century AD. The first questionable depiction of it in art appears on painted moulded-bricks in the Three Kingdoms (220–265 AD) era tomb of Bao Sanniang at Zhaohua, Sichuan province, China. These paintings display an amply padded horse collar with no sign of a yoke. However, the earliest legitimate depiction of it in art is on a Dunhuang cave mural (cave 257) from the Chinese Northern Wei dynasty, the painting dated to 477–499 AD. In this painting the arching cross bar is clear, but the artist failed to clearly show the cushioned collar behind it, without which the  whole design would have been rendered useless.

The same basic design is seen in other painted Chinese frescoes, one from 520 to 524 AD (with shafts projecting beyond the horses chest for sternal traction), and another circa 600 AD (Sui dynasty). This Sui dynasty depiction (in cave 302) is of particular interest, since its depiction of the horse collar is not only more accurate (the same seen even in north and northwest China today), but it is used for a camel, not a horse. The Chinese had used camels often from the 2nd century BC onwards during the Han dynasty, and there was even a Camel Corps serving the military on the frontier of the Tarim Basin. However, the adapted horse collar for camels would not have been common until the 6th century. In cave 156, there is a panorama painting of the Tang dynasty Chinese general and provincial governor Zhang Yichao riding triumphantly after the recapture and conquest of the Dunhuang region from the Tibetan Empire in 834 AD. According to evidence provided by Dr. Chang Shuhong, the date of the painting is precisely 851 AD, yet Needham points out that there is universal consensus amongst historians that it was painted anytime between roughly 840 to 860 AD. This latter painting accurately depicts the horse collar, with a well-padded collar coming low on the chest and rising behind the cross-bar.

Europe 

The horse collar eventually spread to Europe c. 920 AD, and became universal by the 12th century. The Scandinavians were among the first to use a horse collar that did not constrain the breathing passages of the horses. Prior to this development, oxen still remained the primary choice of animal for farm labor, as all the previous harnesses and collars could only be worn by them without physical penalty. Additionally, the yoke used to harness oxen were made exclusive to each individual animal. However it was sometimes difficult to cultivate the land; based upon soil condition, it may have taken up to sixteen oxen to effectively use a single heavy plow.  This made it difficult for farmers who lacked the capital to sustain such large numbers.

When the horse was harnessed with a horse collar, the horse could apply 50% more power to a task than an ox due to its greater speed. Horses generally also have greater endurance and can work more hours in a day.  The centuries-long association that the Europeans had with the use of horses allowed an easier transition from oxen-based harnesses to the horse collar.

Impact of the horse collar 

The creation of the horse collar removed the previous physical restrictions the old harness had on the animal, and allowed the horse to be able to exert its full strength in plowing. Originally, the structure of the old harness forced the horse to literally pull its workload, the horse collar's development instead allowed the horse to push its workload, increasing the efficiency of its labor output.

Following the introduction of the horse collar to Europe and its use being clearly evident by 1000 AD, the use of horses for ploughing became more widespread. Horses work roughly 50 percent faster than oxen.   With the collar, combined with the horseshoe, the heavy plow, and other developments in the agricultural system, the efficiency of the European peasant farmer in producing food increased, allowing further societal development in Europe. The surplus in food allowed labor specialization as farmers could change their occupation and focus on other skills, such as the purchase and selling of goods, resulting in the emergence of a merchant class within European society. The horse collar was one of the factors in the ending of the feudal system and transition from the Middle Ages.

Weight pulling studies 
The French cavalry officer Lefebvre des Noëttes experimented with the ancient throat-and-girth harness in comparison the later trace breast-harness and then finally the matured form of the medieval collar harness. In his experiment of 1910, he found that two horses (aided by effective traction) using the throat-and-girth harness were limited to pulling about 1100 lbs. ( ton). However, a single horse with a more efficient collar harness could draw a weight of about  tons.

However, the findings of Lefebvre des Noëttes were not without challenges, notably the argument that there was an early partial horse collar, a dorsal yoke system, dating to ancient Rome, and that Lefebvre's designs did not accurately reflect those actually used, but rather created an inaccurate design that was less efficient than any actual ancient harnesses used.  While Lefebvre's experiments clearly demonstrated that the throat and girth design he used rode up on horses and cut off their air, images from ancient art and partial yokes found by archaeologists suggested that with proper placement and the addition of a stiff partial yoke, the breastcollar remained on the chest, and wind was not in fact cut off while pulling.  Further studies conducted in 1977 by Spruytte and Littauer, followed up by Georges Raepsaet, with more accurately reconstructed ancient designs suggested that horses with ancient harness designs could pull nearly as much as with the more modern horse collar.  The primary benefit to the use of the modern horse collar, it is argued, was that it allowed a lower point of attachment and in so doing increased the usability of horses for ploughing.

See also 

 Collar (animal)
 Horse harness
 Draft horse
 Oxbow
 Yoke

References

Citations

Sources 
 Bolich, Susan, The History of Farming Machinery, Oxford University Press, 2005
 Braudel, Fernand, Civilization and Capitalism, 15th–18th Century: The Structure of Everyday Life, University of California Press, 1992
 Chamberlain, J. Edward, Horse: How the Horse Has Shaped Civilizations, Blue Bridge, Virginia, 2006
 Needham, Joseph, Science and Civilisation in China: Volume 4, Physics and Physical Technology, Part 2, Mechanical Engineering. Taipei: Caves Books Ltd., 1986. 
 Riddle, John M.,  A History of the Middle Ages, 300–1500, Rowman & Littlefield, 2008
 Spruytte, J., Littauer, M., Early Harness Systems, Hyperion Books, 1990
 Wigelsworth, Jeffrey R., Science and Technology in Medieval European Life, Greenwood Publishing Group, 2006

Chaldea
Chinese inventions
History of agriculture
Horse harness
Technology in the Middle Ages